Alireza Salimi is an Iranian Shi'a cleric and conservative politician who currently serves as a member of the Iranian Parliament representing Mahalat and Delijan counties.

He is a member of the committee overseeing the conduct of Iranian lawmakers.

References 

Front of Islamic Revolution Stability politicians
1964 births
Members of the 10th Islamic Consultative Assembly
Living people
People from Mahallat